Football NSW is the governing body for soccer in the Australian state of New South Wales, with the exception of the northern regions of NSW (the governing body for which is Northern New South Wales Football). Football NSW is a member of the national governing body,  Football Australia. Football NSW's premier football competition is the National Premier Leagues NSW. The premier futsal competition is the Futsal Premier League. Prior to 1 April 2007, Football NSW was known as Soccer NSW.

History
The first soccer association was founded in New South Wales in 1882 as the "South British Football Soccer Association". It was succeeded in 1898 by the "New South Wales British Football Association" and eventually in 1921 by the "Australian Soccer Football Association".
The first state league in New South Wales was formed in 1928 and by 1943 a new association was formed to oversee the game in New South Wales specifically, called "New South Wales Soccer Football Association". This was formed into a company in 1945.

By 1957 many clubs in New South Wales were left disgruntled by the way the game was run by the NSW Soccer Football Association due to numerous factors. Some migrant communities had created their own clubs when they were faced with closed doors by already established suburban clubs. After a meeting lead by Hakoah president, Walter Sternberg in his Bellevue Hill home, a new association was born, called the "NSW Federation of Soccer Clubs". This federation effectively took control over the game from the former NSW Soccer Football Association.

The events of 1957 also lead to a change in management nationally. With the Australian Soccer Football Association (ASFA) suspended by FIFA over player poaching disputes and the creation of Federations in other states, the Australian Soccer Federation (ASF) was created in 1961 to replace the old association. However, the ASF only gained control of operations from the ASFA after they sent a £5000 bond to FIFA in 1963.

In 1995, "Soccer Australia" replaced the "Australian Soccer Federation" and so the governing body of New South Wales became "Soccer NSW".

Soccer NSW remained in control of the game for a decade until another national change took place in 2005 when Soccer Australia changed its name to "Football Federation Australia". Soccer NSW however, did not officially change its name to "Football NSW" until 1 April 2007.

Headquarters

The headquarters of Football NSW are located at Valentine Sports Park, Glenwood. Valentine Sports Park is a multipurpose sporting complex which caters for various groups, as well as individuals. The complex consists of twin, triple and quad rooms accommodating up to 180 people, 5 playing fields, lecture rooms, indoor sports hall, 20 metre outdoor pool, sports medicine centre and a dining room open for breakfast, lunch and dinner. It also contains the offices of the Football NSW staff.

Football
The majority of Football NSW's time goes into the football competitions they oversee and run. Football NSW oversees the running of numerous representative youth, Men's & Women's association football leagues and cups, a number of which are non-amateur. They also oversee the countless club and amateur competitions run by the affiliated associations around the state. For a detailed rundown of the various leagues and systems run in New South Wales see Football (soccer) in New South Wales.

Futsal
Football NSW is also the governing body for Futsal is New South Wales. There are two representative leagues named the "Futsal Premier League" (Known as the SELECT Futsal Premier League for sponsorship reasons) and the "Futsal Premier League 2" (Known as the SELECT FPL2). Originally there was only one representative league with 16 teams. In the 06/07 season the competition was cut into 2 separate divisions of 8 teams each. In the 07/08 season the top 8 clubs in the club championship (aggregate points of all teams) from that season were put in the First Division while the last 8 were put in the second division. Now in 18/19 there is 8 premier league teams and 8 premier league 2 teams.

Football NSW Leagues clubs
Below are listed the Men's all member clubs of Football NSW for the National Premier Leagues competitions and Football NSW League One and Two for 2023.

Associations and Branches

As one of two state governing body for football in New South Wales, Football NSW oversees all aspects of the sport within the southern part of the state. At a local level, Football NSW works with 15 regional-based constituent association members which oversee in all aspects of the sport within their respected region. Three Football NSW branches also exist in a similar capacity.

 Metro Associations (Representative teams)
 Bankstown District Amateur Football Association (Bankstown United)
 Blacktown & District Soccer Football Association (Blacktown Spartans)
 Canterbury District Soccer Football Association
 Central Coast Football (Central Coast United)
 Eastern Suburbs Football Association
 Football South Coast (South Coast Flame FC)
 Granville & District Soccer Football Association (Parramatta FC)
 Hills Football
 Macarthur District Soccer Football Association (Macarthur Rams)
 Manly Warringah Football Association (Manly United)
 Nepean Football Association (Nepean FC) 
 North West Sydney Football Ltd. (GHFA Spirit)
 Northern Suburbs Football Association (Northern Tigers)
 Southern Districts Soccer Football Association (SD Raiders)
 St. George Football Association
 Sutherland Shire Football Association
 Sydney Amateur Football League

Regional Associations
 Albury Wodonga Football Association
 Bathurst District Football Association
 Dubbo District Football Association
 Eurobodalla Football Association
 Far South Coast Football Association
 Football Wagga Wagga
 Griffith & District Football Association
 Highlands Soccer Association
 Lachlan Amateur Soccer Association Inc.
 Lithgow District Football Association
 Orange District Football Association
 Shoalhaven District Football Association
 South West Slopes Football Association
 Southern Tablelands Football Association
 Western Plains Amateur Soccer Association

Branches
 Southern NSW Football
 Football Riverina
 Western NSW Football

Past League Winners 
The sections below list previous league winners. League winners are listed as first place in the standings at the end of the regular section, not winners of the finals series (when held).

1957–1958 
The first season of the newly formed Soccer NSW began with two divisions. Canterbury-Marrickville were the inaugural premiers of Division One.

1959–1962
After two seasons, a third division was added.

1963–1970
Division Three disbanded to form lower grade Amateur Leagues.

1971–1976
Amateur Leagues/Inter suburban leagues reformed to create another Division Three.

1977–1978
Another division was then added in 1977, creating four divisions.

1979–1982
The top four divisions were renamed for a few seasons.

1983–1988
State League reverted to Division One naming, while Division Three disbanded back to lower Inter Urban leagues, leaving three premier divisions.

1989–1991
Division Four was re-introduced.

1992–2000
Again the premier division was renamed, this time to the "Super League". Lower divisions were renamed accordingly from Division One.

2000–2012
2000 saw another shake-up of the league structures. The Super League was brought forward to become a summer competition and be aligned with the National Soccer League (NSL). It was called the "Premier League". Division One was then changed to the "Winter Super League", starting and finishing in 2001. Divisions Two and Three were renamed States League 1 and 2 respectively, and were also conducted over the winter of 2001. During the demise of the NSL and rise of the A-League, the Premier League reverted to playing over winter for the 2006 season. This meant there was approximately nine months break between competitions.

2013–2015
Another overhaul of the league structure occurred with the introduction of the nationwide National Premier Leagues. State Federations were required to name their premier leagues as such. For Football NSW, the meant the "Premier League" was to be called "National Premier Leagues NSW" instead. The "Super League" also had to follow suit, becoming the "National Premier Leagues NSW 2". State Leagues remained the same.

2016–2019
Another minor change occurred for the 2016 season, with State League 1 adopting the "NPL NSW 3 moniker", thus State League 2 was reverted to simply State League.

2020–2021
After a further review, there was another restructure which came into effect in the 2020 season, with the branding of an NPL4 competition.

2022–present
The 2022 season saw more changes as the NPL 2, NPL 3 and NPL 4 competitions were renamed to League One, League Two and League Three respectively.

References

External links
 Football NSW - Official website

New
Soccer in New South Wales
Sports governing bodies in New South Wales
1882 establishments in Australia
Sports organizations established in 1882